Adam Long may refer to:

Adam Long (British actor) (born 1991)
Adam Long (American actor), American actor and playwright
Adam Long (footballer) (born 2000)
Adam Long (golfer) (born 1987)